Noel Paton may refer to:

Joseph Noel Paton (1821–1901), Scottish artist, illustrator and sculptor
Diarmid Noel Paton (1859–1928), his son, Scottish physician and academic